Dairy Development  Corporation or commonly known as DDC is  a public enterprise owned by the Nepal Government which collects milk, produce dairy products and supplies to the customers.  The corporation  was  established  in  1969. The main aim of DDC is to  guarantee  market  and  fair  price  to  the  milk  producers  and supply hygienic milk and milk products to urban centres. DDC has 45% of the market share in Nepal, while remaining is catered by private dairies.

History
Dairy Development Commission was formed by the government in 1955. The commission was converted  into  the  dairy  development  board  in  1962  and  this  board  created the  Dairy  Development  Corporation in July 1969 under  the Corporation Act 1964 (2021 BS).

Milk collection
DDC buys milk of cow, buffalo and nak/chauri (female Yak)from 33 districts throughout Nepal. Approximately 60,000 farmers supply milk to the corporation. It collects milk regionally though local collection centres run by following schemes:

See also
Nepal Dairy
Agriculture in Nepal

References

External links
Official website
National Dairy Development Board

Government agencies of Nepal
1955 establishments in Nepal